The Valderrama Province is  a subregion of the Colombian Department of Boyacá. The subregion is formed by 7 municipalities. The province is named after Antonio Valderrama.

Municipalities 
Betéitiva • Chita • Jericó • Paz de Río • Socotá • Socha • Tasco

References 

Provinces of Boyacá Department